Guinea is divided into 8 administrative regions. 7 regions other than Conakry Region are further subdivided into 33 prefectures.

See also
 Administrative divisions of Guinea
 Prefectures of Guinea
 Sub-prefectures of Guinea
 ISO 3166-2:GN

References

 
Subdivisions of Guinea
Guinea, Regions
Guinea 1
Regions, Guinea
Guinea geography-related lists